Bolsena is a town and comune of Italy, in the province of Viterbo in northern Lazio on the eastern shore of Lake Bolsena. It is 10 km (6 mi) north-north west of Montefiascone and 36 km (22 mi) north-west of Viterbo. The ancient Via Cassia, today's highway SR143, follows the lake shore for some distance, passing through Bolsena.

History

While it is fairly certain that the city is the successor to the ancient Roman town of Volsinii (sometimes termed Volsinii Novi – New Volsinii – to distinguish it from the Etruscan city), scholarly opinion is sharply divided as to whether Volsinii was the same as the ancient Etruscan city of Velzna or Velsuna (sometimes termed Volsinii Veteres – Old Volsinii), the other candidate being Orvieto, 20 km (12 mi) NE. George Dennis pointed out that the town of Bolsena has no Etruscan characteristics; for example, Etruscan cities were built on defensible crags, which the hill on which the castle is situated is not. The Roman historian Pliny the Elder said that a bolt from Mars fell on Bolsena, "the richest town in Tuscany" and that the city was entirely burned up by this bolt. The population moved to another site, which Dennis thought was Bolsena. The new city was named after the old, hence Roman Bolsena has an Etruscan name. Dennis suggests a number of crags in the area including Orvieto but does not favor Orvieto on the grounds that it is too far away.

Etruscan tombs
A number of Etruscan tombs have been found in the vicinity of Bolsena. Funerary objects from these tombs are now located in Italy and abroad, including a fine collection in the British Museum.

Miracle
Bolsena is known for a miracle said to have occurred in the Basilica of Santa Cristina in 1263, when a Bohemian priest, in doubt about the doctrine of Transubstantiation, reported bleeding from the host he had consecrated at Mass. The Orvieto Cathedral was eventually built to commemorate the miracle and house the Corporal of Bolsena in a reliquary made by Sienese goldsmith Ugolino di Vieri in 1337–1338.

A famed fresco by Raphael and his school in the Vatican Stanze depicts the event.

US Navy base
The United States Navy established a naval air station on 21 February 1918 to operate seaplanes during World War I. The base closed shortly after the First Armistice at Compiègne.

See also
 Volsinii

References

Further reading
Bell, Sinclair and Alexandra A. Carpino, eds. 2016. A Companion to the Etruscans. Blackwell Companions to the Ancient World. Chichester: John Wiley & Sons. 
Haynes, Sybille. 2000. Etruscan civilization: A cultural history. Los Angeles: J. Paul Getty Museum.
Pallottino, Massimo. 1978. The Etruscans. Bloomington: Indiana University Press.
Sprenger, Maia, and Gilda Bartoloni. 1983. The Etruscans: Their history, art and architecture. Translated by Robert E. Wolf. New York: Harry N. Abrams.
Turfa, Jean MacIntosh, ed. 2013. The Etruscan World. Routledge Worlds. Abingdon, UK: Routledge.

External links

 

Cities and towns in Lazio